Benetússer is a municipality in the comarca of Horta Sud in the Valencian Community, Spain. At the 2001 census the municipality had a population of 13,425 inhabitants and a land area of only 0.78 km² (0.301 sq mi). Its population density of 17,211.5 persons/km² was the third highest in Spain (after Mislata and L'Hospitalet de Llobregat).

References

External links

Ajuntament de Benetússer Official website  (Valencian)

Municipalities in the Province of Valencia
Horta Sud